Cornucopia, also known as the John and Mary Price Farm, is a historic home and farm located near Middletown, New Castle County, Delaware.  The house was built about 1845, and is a -story, five bay "L"-shaped frame dwelling with a gable roof in a vernacular Greek Revival style. It has a -story wing and features a tetra-style verandah on brick piers. Also on the property are the contributing meat/dairy house, crib barn, hay barn and cow barn attached by an implement shed, three poultry sheds, and an implement shed with a shop and wagon shed.

It was listed on the National Register of Historic Places in 1987.

References

Houses on the National Register of Historic Places in Delaware
Farms on the National Register of Historic Places in Delaware
Greek Revival houses in Delaware
Houses completed in 1845
Houses in New Castle County, Delaware
National Register of Historic Places in New Castle County, Delaware
Buildings and structures in Middletown, Delaware